The two-man women's bobsleigh competition at the 2018 Winter Olympics was held on 20 and 21 February at the Alpensia Sliding Centre near Pyeongchang, South Korea.

Qualification

The top two countries in the 2017–18 Bobsleigh season (including the World Cup, Europe races and Americas Cup) were awarded the maximum three sleds. The next four countries were awarded two sleds each. The remaining six sleds were awarded to six countries, with Australia being awarded an Oceania continental quota, Nigeria being awarded with the African quota and South Korea being awarded a slot as host nation.

Results
The first two runs were held on 20 February and the last runs on 21 February 2018.

With Mariama Jamanka (1st), Elana Meyers Taylor & Lauren Gibbs (2nd) and Phylicia George (3rd) all making the podium, it marked the first time in Winter Olympic history that black athletes won gold, silver and bronze medals in the same event.

References

Bobsleigh at the 2018 Winter Olympics
Women's bobsleigh at the 2018 Winter Olympics
Women's events at the 2018 Winter Olympics